The Prime Minister is a 1941 British historical drama film directed by Thorold Dickinson and starring John Gielgud, Diana Wynyard, Fay Compton and Stephen Murray.

It details the life and times of Benjamin Disraeli, who became Prime Minister of the United Kingdom. It depicts his long marriage to Mary Disraeli and his relationship with various other public figures of the era including William Gladstone, Lord Melbourne and Queen Victoria. Gielgud would later reprise his role as Disraeli in the ITV television drama Edward the Seventh (1975).

The film was shot at Teddington Studios by the British subsidiary of Warner Brothers. The company had previously made a successful biopic of the Prime Minister as Disraeli in 1929. The film's sets were designed by the art director Norman G. Arnold.

Plot
The film is not a remake of the 1929 film Disraeli, which depicted only one incident late in Disraeli's career.  Instead, The Prime Minister is an episodic biography of Disraeli from his early career as a novelist through his political triumphs as an elder statesman.  The film is almost a hagiography, depicting Disraeli as a lifelong social reformer and a Tory democrat dedicated to "England" and to "democracy". TCM.com describes the film this way—

The Prime Minister (1941) is the legendary Benjamin Disraeli, played by the legendary John Gielgud in a tour-de-force performance that takes Disraeli from a foppish young novelist, to a neophyte member of Parliament, to prime minister of England and confidante of Queen Victoria. Along the way, "Dizzy" woos and weds his wife Mary Anne, who provides shrewd support for his career. He also battles political opponents, helps the poor and working class, buys the Suez Canal, expands the empire, and foils the imperialist plans of the German-Austrian-Russian political alliance.

Cast

Notes
The Prime Minister opened in the United States in February 1942, eleven months after its British premiere. The American version was cut by 15 minutes— among the scenes removed was one featuring Glynis Johns, then beginning her career.

Box office
According to Warner Bros records the film earned the studio $16,000 domestically and $21,000 foreign.

References

External links
 
 
 
 
 

1941 films
Fiction set in 1837
British biographical drama films
British black-and-white films
Films directed by Thorold Dickinson
Cultural depictions of Benjamin Disraeli
Films set in London
Films set in Berlin
1940s biographical drama films
1940s historical drama films
British historical drama films
Films about prime ministers of the United Kingdom
Cultural depictions of Queen Victoria on film
1940s political drama films
Films set in the 1830s
Films shot at Teddington Studios
British political drama films
Films scored by Jack Beaver
1941 drama films
1940s English-language films
1940s British films